Andrés Crespo Arosemena is an Ecuadorian actor, director, writer and broadcaster.

Biography
Crespo studied law at the University of Guayaquil for two semesters. After retiring from the university, at age 19, he dedicated himself to surfing.

In 1998 he made a short film called Niño Danny. In 2000 he conducted a 14-minute documentary called Sonnya which won an award at the Festival of Octahedron, in Quito. Then he made a short film called Filo de toilette, which appeared in the International Film Festival of Cuenca.

In 2004 he acted as a prisoner in the film Crónicas. Crespo also had the role in the 2009 film, Prometheus deported. In 2010 a documentary entitled Beyond The Mall. In 2011 he played the role of judge Neira in the movie Without Autumn, Without Spring, also had a starring role in the film by Sebastián Cordero, Fisherman, as Blanquito. Managed the post-production of the movie Let's not talk about certain things and played Lagarto. Also handled the post- production of the film Ochetaisiete in 2012 and played the character of Juan's dad.

Filmography 
 Crónicas (2004)
 Prometeo Deportado (2010)
 Pescador (2011)
 Sin Otoño, Sin Primavera (2012)
 Mejor no hablar de ciertas cosas (2013)
 Secretos (2013-2014)
 Ochenta y siete (película) (2014)
 Feriado (2014)
 Instantánea (película) (2016)
 Sin muertos no hay carnaval (2016)
 Enchufe.tv: Las Amigas de Camilo con Blanquito (special appearance)
 Narcos (2017)

References

Ecuadorian male film actors
People from Guayaquil
Living people
Ecuadorian film directors
Year of birth missing (living people)
21st-century Ecuadorian male actors